Hunshyal may refer to:

 Hunshyal (P.G.), a village in Karnataka, India
 Hunshyal (P.Y.), a village in Karnataka, India